Lake Harmony is an unincorporated community in Kidder Township, Carbon County, Pennsylvania, United States. The population was 718 at the 2010 census. It is served by ZIP code 18624.

History
Frederick Charles Brenckman wrote in 1913:

The Split Rock Lodge and Lake Harmony was originally a private retreat for the executives of the Lehigh Coal and Navigation Company, but much of the land was sold to developers. The lodge was destroyed by fire in 1970. A portion of the building survived the blaze, and it was rebuilt and sold to Village Square, Incorporated.

Geography
The community is located of the shores of the eponymous Lake Harmony. It has a warm-summer humid continental climate (Dfb) and average monthly temperatures range from 22.2° F in January to 68.0° F in July. The hardiness zone is 5b.

Demographics

Lake Harmony is neither an incorporated area nor a census-designated place, all the data is for the ZIP code 18624. As of the census of 2010, there were 718 people, 359 households, and 203 families residing in the community. The population density was 43.5 people per square mile (6.6/km). There were 1,594 housing units at an average density of 96.6/sq mi (12.3/km). The racial makeup of thecommunity was 95.8% White, 1.7% African American, 0.1% Native American, 0.7% Asian, 1.0% from other races, and 0.7% from two or more races. Hispanic or Latino of any race were 3.1% of the population.

There were 359 households, out of which 14.8% had children under the age of 18 living with them, 46.8% were married couples living together, 5.6% had a female householder with no husband present, and 43.5% were non-families. Out of all the households, 7.5% had someone living alone who was 65 years of age or older. The average household size was 2.0 and the average family size was 2.61. 69.95 of the housing units were for seasonal, recreational, or occasional use.

In the community the population was spread out, with 14.4% under the age of 18, 4.7% from 19 to 24, 18.2% from 25 to 44, 37.4% from 45 to 64, and 25.3% who were 65 years of age or older. The median age was 52 years. The gender distribution was 52.9% male and 47.1% female.

According to the American Community Survey in 2013, the median income for a household in the community was $61,563, and the median income for a family was $62,500.

References

External links
Lake Harmony Rescue Squad Ambulance

Unincorporated communities in Carbon County, Pennsylvania
Unincorporated communities in Pennsylvania